Behareh may refer to:
 Behareh-ye Bard-e Khiari